Zeitgeist Films is a New York-based distribution company founded in 1988 which acquires and distributes films from the U.S. and around the world. In 2017, Zeitgeist entered into a multi-year strategic alliance with film distributor Kino Lorber.

Zeitgeist has distributed early films by directors such as Todd Haynes, Christopher Nolan, Francois Ozon, Laura Poitras, Atom Egoyan, and the Quay Brothers. Their catalog also includes filmmakers such as Marguerite von Trotta, Ken Loach, Guy Maddin, Derek Jarman, Nuri Bilge Ceylan, Peter Greenaway, Yvonne Rainer, Andrei Zyvagintsev, Astra Taylor, and Raoul Peck. Previous Zeitgeist Films releases in association with Kino Lorber include Ken Loach's Sorry We Missed You, Ric Burns’ Oliver Sacks: His Own Life, and M.C. Escher: Journey to Infinity.

Zeitgeist films have been nominated for Academy Awards several times. Nowhere in Africa (2001), won the Academy Award for Best Foreign Language Film. Their films have been featured in various film festivals including Cannes, Berlin, Sundance, Tribeca, and IDFA in Amsterdam. The Museum of Modern Art honored Zeitgeist with a month-long, 20th anniversary retrospective of their films in 2008. Founders Russo and Gerstman received a Lifetime Achievement Award from the Art House Convergence in 2020.

Upcoming films

Selected films

Awards 
 Trouble the Water – 2008 Academy Award Nominee for Best Documentary Feature
 Tulpan – Kazakhstan's 2009 Academy Award submission for Best Foreign Language Film
 Three Monkeys – Turkey's 2009 Academy Award submission for Best Foreign Language Film
 Into Great Silence – 2006 Sundance Special Jury Prize
 Nowhere in Africa – 2002 Academy Award for Best Foreign Language Film
 Sophie Scholl – The Final Days – 2005 Academy Award nominee for Best Foreign Language Film
 Taste of Cherry – 1997 Palme d'Or at the Cannes Film Festival
 Poison – 1991 Sundance Grand Jury Prize winner
 The Umbrellas of Cherbourg (1996 re-release) – Academy Award nominee, Palme d'Or winner (1964)

References

External links 
Official website
Zeitgeist Films at IMDb
Zeitgeist Films at Facebook
Zeitgeist Films at Tumblr
Zeitgeist Films at Twitter
Zeitgeist Films at Instagram

Film distributors of the United States
Entertainment companies established in 1988
Privately held companies based in New York City